Jyotirmay Singh Mahato is an Indian politician. He was elected to the Lok Sabha, lower house of the Parliament of India from Purulia, West Bengal in 2019 as a member of the Bharatiya Janata Party. His village name is Patradih in Purulia District. He is also serving as one of the State General Secretary of West Bengal unit of BJP from June 2020. Committee On Minst of Youth Affairs & Sports

References

External links
 Official biographical sketch in Parliament of India website

India MPs 2019–present
Lok Sabha members from West Bengal
Living people
Bharatiya Janata Party politicians from West Bengal
1985 births
People from Purulia district